Francis Dickens was the son of Charles Dickens.

Francis or Frank Dickens or Dickins is also the name of:

Frank Dickens (1932–2016), British cartoonist
Frank Dickens (biochemist)
Francis Dickins, MP for Cambridge